was an admiral in the Imperial Japanese Navy, politician and Prime Minister of Japan from 1934 to 1936.

Biography

Early life
Okada was born on 20 January 1868, in Fukui Prefecture, the son of a samurai of the Fukui Domain. He attended the 15th class of the Imperial Japanese Naval Academy, graduating 7th out of a class of 80 cadets in 1889. He served as a midshipman on the ironclad warship Kongō and the cruiser . He was commissioned an ensign on 9 July 1890.

He was promoted to lieutenant on 9 December 1894, to lieutenant-commander on 29 September 1899 and to commander on 13 July 1904.

He was promoted to captain on 25 September 1908 and given his own command, the Kasuga on 25 July 1910.

Promoted to rear admiral on 1 December 1913, Okada served in a number of desk jobs thereafter, including that of the Naval Shipbuilding Command. He was promoted to vice admiral on 1 December 1917 and to full admiral on 11 June 1924.

Okada assumed the post of Commander-in-chief of the Combined Fleet in 1924. In 1927, he became Minister of Navy in the administration of Tanaka Giichi, but resigned in 1929 to assume the post of military councillor on the Supreme War Council.

Okada was one of the few supporters (Treaty Faction) within the upper ranks of the Imperial Japanese Navy of the arms reduction treaty resulting from the London Naval Treaty of 1930, which he helped negotiate and worked hard for its ratification.  He again served as Navy Minister in the Saitō Makoto cabinet of 1932.

Okada entered the reserves on 21 January 1933 and retired five years later.

Political career
In July 1934, Okada was named Prime Minister of Japan holding simultaneously the portfolio of Minister of Colonial Affairs. In the month of September 1935, he also briefly held the portfolio of Minister of Post and Telecommunications. Okada was one of the democratic and moderate voices against the increasing strength of the militarists, and was therefore a major target for extremist forces pushing for a more totalitarian Japan. He narrowly escaped assassination in the February 26 Incident of 1936, largely because rebel troops killed Colonel Denzō Matsuo, brother-in-law as well as personal secretary of Okada's, by misidentifying him as the prime minister. Okada emerged from hiding on 29 February 1936. However, he left office a few days later.

Okada was adamant in his opposition to the war with the United States. During World War II, Okada formed a group of like-minded politicians and military officers seeking an early end to the hostilities. After the defeat of Japanese forces at the Battle of Midway and Battle of Guadalcanal, Okada pushed for negotiations with the Allies, and played a leading role in the overthrow of the Hideki Tōjō cabinet in 1944.

Okada died in 1952, and his grave is at the Tama Reien Cemetery, in Fuchū, Tokyo.

Honors
From the corresponding article in the Japanese Wikipedia

Order of the Golden Kite, (3rd class) (1915)
Grand Cordon of the Order of the Rising Sun (1920)
Grand Cordon of the Order of the Paulownia Flowers (1933)

See also 
 Okada Cabinet

Notes

References
 ; 

  ;  OCLC 44090600

External links

 

1868 births
1952 deaths
20th-century prime ministers of Japan
Government ministers of Japan
Ministers of the Imperial Japanese Navy
Prime Ministers of Japan
Military personnel from Fukui Prefecture
Imperial Japanese Navy admirals
People of the First Sino-Japanese War
Japanese military personnel of the Russo-Japanese War
People of Meiji-period Japan
Japanese military personnel of World War I
Japanese military personnel of World War II
Recipients of the Order of the Rising Sun
Recipients of the Order of the Golden Kite